Ayala Truelove  (née Liran, ; born 16 August 1975) is an Israeli international football striker. She has also represented Great Britain in the sport of gliding.

Football career

Club
Ayala won the 1995–96 FA Women's Premier League Cup with Wembley Ladies. In the final against Doncaster Belles she scored an injury time penalty to tie the game at 2–2; allowing Wembley to win on penalties. After being an unused substitute in Wembley's 1997 FA Women's Cup final defeat to Millwall Lionesses, Ayala signed for FA Women's Premier League National Division rivals Croydon.

A spell with Reading Royals preceded Ayala's return to the National Division with Southampton Saints in 2000. She also represented Thatcham before joining Bracknell Town Ladies. Having overcome a serious knee injury, Ayala continues with Bracknell Town as of 2011.

International
Ayala was called–up by Israel and won 12 caps, including two appearances in qualifying for the 2003 FIFA Women's World Cup.

Gliding
In 2001 Ayala took up gliding and represented the UK at the 2009 Women's World Gliding Championships in Szeged. After leading for much of the competition she finished fourth. At the 2011 competition in Arboga Ayala won a silver medal. In 2013 in the Women's World Gliding Championships in Issoudun, Ayala again won a silver medal after leading at the start of the final day. She represented UK in the Club-class in the full British team (not the women's team) at 2017 European Gliding Championships at Moravska Trebova, Czech Republic.

References

External links
Ayala Liran at Israel Football Association
Ayala Liran at FIFA
Ayala Liran at Bracknell Town Ladies

1975 births
Living people
Israeli Jews
Israeli women's footballers
Israel women's international footballers
FA Women's National League players
Charlton Athletic W.F.C. players
Southampton Saints L.F.C. players
Glider pilots
Barnet F.C. Ladies players
Expatriate women's footballers in England
Israeli expatriate sportspeople in England
Women's association football forwards